Naser Kelmendi (born 15 February 1957 in Peć, Kosovo, SFR Yugoslavia) is a Bosnian drug trafficker of Kosovo Albanian descent.

Career 
Kelmendi was born in Kosovo, then an autonomous province within Serbia as part of the Socialist Federal Republic of Yugoslavia. In 1976 he served time in prison for attempted murder. He then moved to Bosnia and Herzegovina in the 1990s, and established his criminal operations in Sarajevo. While in the city, he greatly expanded his criminal network, being linked to criminals such as Safet "Sajo" Kalic, a suspected Montenegrin drug trafficker, but also maintaining contacts with important businessmen, including developer Fahrudin Radoncic, owner of Dnevni avaz, Bosnia's largest circulation newspaper. His criminal activities included not only drug trafficking but also cigarette smuggling, money laundering and loan sharking.

Naser Kelmendi and members of his family have been investigated multiple times by Bosnian police over the years. In 2008 Bosnian police produced a report on him to Interpol, revealing his vast influence in the country's drug trafficking rings. Despite this, as reported by the OCCRP, Kelmendi and his sons still were allowed to retain legal weapon permits. Kelmendi first came to international public scrutiny as a result of being the main suspect for the murder of his rival Ramiz Delalić, a Bosnian criminal and warlord who was the main perpetrator of the shooting of Nikola Gardović on 1 March 1992, considered the first murder of the Bosnian War.

After initially fleeing to Montenegro, Kelmendi was arrested by the Kosovo Police in Pristina on 6 May 2013. Since Bosnia and Herzegovina does not recognize Kosovo, and thus has no extradition agreement with it, Kelmendi was tried in Pristina for crimes that he was alleged to have committed in Bosnia and Herzegovina. In 2018, Kelmendi was sentenced to six years in prison for drug trafficking in Kosovo.

Kelmendi's son, Elvis Kelmendi, was arrested in July 2022 by Bosnian police for drug trafficking.

References

External links
 OCCRP investigation on Kelmendi

1957 births
Living people
Bosnia and Herzegovina criminals
Kosovan criminals
Male criminals
Prisoners and detainees of Serbia
Drug traffickers